Scott W. Stern is an American scholar. He graduated from Taylor Allderdice High School in 2011. He graduated from Yale University, in American Studies. His thesis on the American Plan won the Norman Holmes Pearson Prize.

Works

Movie announcement
In 2017, Cathy Schulman’s Welle Entertainment acquired the film rights to The Trials of Nina McCall. Writer Laura Harrington was chosen to adapt the book to film.

References

External links 

Why hero worship is a mistake for the left, Washington Post article by Scott Stern

Yale University alumni